Sonny is a common nickname and occasional given name. Often it can be a derivative of the English word "Son", a name derived from the Ancient Germanic element *sunn meaning "sun", a nickname derived from the Italian name Salvatore (especially in North America, amongst Italian Americans), or the Slavic male name Slavon meaning "famous or glorious". 

Notable people with the name include:

Athletes 
Charles Sonny Ates (1935–2010), retired American racecar driver
Erwin Sonny Bishop (born 1939), American football player
Shin'ichi Sonny Chiba (born 1939), Japanese martial artist and actor
Sonny Gray (born 1989), American baseball pitcher
Sidney "Sonny" Hertzberg (1922–2005), American basketball player
Sonny Holland (1938-2022), American football coach and player
Ernest Sonny Hutchins (1929–2005), stock car driver
Christian Sonny Jurgensen (born 1934), American Hall-of-Fame National Football League quarterback
Sonny Liles (1919–2005), American football player
Charles Sonny Liston (c. 1930–1970), American heavyweight boxer
Frank Sonny Milano (born 1996), American ice hockey player
Robert Sonny Parker (born 1955), American former basketball player
Wilfred Sonny Siebert (born 1937), American former baseball pitcher
Jan Sonny Silooy (born 1963), Dutch former footballer
Anderson da Silva (born 1970), known as Sonny Anderson, Brazilian retired footballer 
Sonny Weems (born 1986), American expatriate basketball player 
Sonny Bill Williams (born 1985), New Zealand former rugby league and rugby union player
Son Heung-min (born 1992), South Korean footballer

Jazz musicians 
Saul Sonny Berman (1925–1947), American trumpeter
Joseph Sonny Burke (1914–1980), American big band leader
Conrad Sonny Clark (1931–1963), American pianist
George Sonny Cohn (1925–2006), American trumpeter
William Sonny Criss (1927–1977), American saxophonist
Francis Sonny Dallas (1931–2007), American bassist
Sonny Fortune (1939–2018), American saxophonist and flautist
Herbert Sonny Greenwich (born 1936), Canadian guitarist
Sonny Greer (1895–1982), American drummer
Percival Sonny Payne (1926–1979), American drummer
Sonny Red (1932–1981), American alto saxophonist
Walter Theodore Sonny Rollins (born 1930), American saxophonist
Warren Sonny Sharrock (1940–1994), American guitarist
Huey Sonny Simmons (1933–2021), American saxophonist and English horn player
Sonny Stitt (1924–1982), American saxophonist born Edward Boatner, Jr.

Other musicians 
 Sonny Double 1, Welsh rapper
 Sonny Black, English singer/songwriter born William Boazman
 Salvatore Sonny Bono (1935–1998), American singer, record producer and politician
 Albert Sonny Burgess (1929–2017), rockabilly singer and guitarist 
 Edwin Sonny Chillingworth (1932–1994), slack-key guitar player from Hawaii
 Albert "Sonny" Cunha (1879–1933), Hawaiian composer
 Sonny Curtis (born 1937), country and pop singer-songwriter
 Sonny Digital (born 1991), American record producer, rapper, and DJ.
 Sonny Emory (born 1962), freelance touring and studio drummer
 Sonny James (1928–2016), stage name of American country music singer James Hugh Loden
 Sonny Kay (born 1972), founder of the record label Gold Standard Laboratories
 Sonny King (singer) (1922–2006), American lounge singer born Luigi Antonio Schiavone
 Clyde Sonny Landreth (born 1951), American blues guitar player
 Sonny Moore (born 1988), better known as Skrillex, American songwriter and electronic music producer
 Sonny Fredie Pedersen, Danish musician and actor
 Sonny Sanders (1939–2016), American soul music singer-songwriter, arranger, and producer
 Paul Sonny Sandoval (born 1974), lead singer of rock band P.O.D.
 Sonny Terry (1911–1986), blind American blues musician born Saunders Terrell
 Joseph Sonny West (born 1937), American rockabilly guitarist and songwriter
 Sonny Boy Williamson I a.k.a. John Lee Williamson (1914–1948), blues singer and harmonica player
 Sonny Boy Williamson II a.k.a. Aleck Ford "Rice" Miller (c.1912–1965), blues singer and harmonica player

Other 
 Sonny Angara (born 1972), Filipino politician
 Ralph Sonny Barger (born 1938), founding member of the original Oakland, California, chapter of the Hells Angels motorcycle club
 Feliciano "Sonny" Belmonte Jr. (born 1936), Filipino politician
 Dominick Napolitano, also known as Sonny Black (1930–1981), capo in the Bonanno crime family
 Alphonse Indelicato, also known as Sonny Red (1931–1981), another capo in the Bonanno crime family, killed during the same gangland war, in which the two led opposite sides
 Sonny Caldinez (born 1932), Trinidadian actor
 Sonny Flood (born 1989), English actor who plays Josh Ashworth on Hollyoaks
 Sonny Grosso (1930–2020), police detective and movie producer from New York 
 John Franzese, Sr. (1917–2020), underboss of the Colombo crime family
 William Sonny Landham (1941–2017), American actor and stuntman
 Sonny Mehta (born Ajai Singh Mehta; 1942–2019), Indian book editor
 Gillespie V. Montgomery (1920–2006), American politician
 George Sonny Perdue (born 1946), U.S. Secretary of Agriculture and former Governor of Georgia
 Shridath Ramphal (born 1928), commonly called "Sonny Ramphal" or "Sir Sonny", Guyanese politician and 2nd Commonwealth Secretary-General 
 Otis Sonny Shroyer (born 1935), American actor
 Delbert Sonny West (1938–2017), American actor and stunt performer
 Harold G. White (born 1965), mechanical engineer, aerospace engineer, and applied physicist

Fictional characters 
Sonny Bonds, protagonist of the first three Police Quest games
Dominick "Sonny" Carisi, Jr., detective on Law & Order: Special Victims Unit
Sonny Corinthos, in the soap opera General Hospital
Santino "Sonny" Corleone, in the film The Godfather, played by James Caan
James "Sonny" Crockett, an undercover police detective in the action drama television series Miami Vice
Sonny Forelli, in the video game Grand Theft Auto: Vice City
Sonny Kiriakis, on the soap opera Days of our Lives
Sonny LoSpecchio, the main character in the film A Bronx Tale, played by Chazz Palminteri
Sonny Lumet, a character in the American television sitcom Bosom Buddies
Sonny Munroe, in Disney Channel Original Series Sonny with a Chance
Sonny Spoon, a police detective character in the TV series Sonny Spoon
Sonny Sumo, a supporting character of DC Comics' Forever People
Sonny Valentine, in the soap opera Hollyoaks
Sonny Weaver, Jr., main character of the 2014 film Draft Day, played by Kevin Costner
Sonny Wolff, the father of Nat and Alex Wolff in The Naked Brothers Band
Sonny Wortzik, main character of Dog Day Afternoon, played by Al Pacino
Sonny, a character in the 2021 Canadian-American movie Mister Sister
Sonny, a character in 1986 the American fantasy drama film The Boy Who Could Fly
Sonny, a robot in the film I, Robot
Sonny, a racer character in the Malaysian animated series Rimba Racer
Sonny the Cuckoo Bird, the mascot for Cocoa Puffs breakfast cereal
Sonny, a well tank locomotive from Thomas & Friends
Sonny, the protagonist of the flash video game Sonny

See also 
Sunny (name), given name and surname

References

Lists of people by nickname